Inuktut is the collective name for the Inuit languages, often used specifically to refer to the Inuit languages of Nunavut:

Inuinnaqtun, spoken in Cambridge Bay and Kugluktuk
Inuktitut, spoken in the rest of Nunavut

Language and nationality disambiguation pages